Francis Gorrin (born September 12, 1983 in Valencia, Carabobo) is a Venezuelan sport shooter. She claimed the gold medal in the air pistol at the 2003 Pan American Games in Santo Domingo, Dominican Republic, and was selected to compete for Venezuela at the 2004 Summer Olympics.

Gorrin first established herself on the world scene, as a 19-year-old, at the 2003 Pan American Games in Santo Domingo, Dominican Republic, where she scored a total of 477.1 points to defeat Colombia's Amanda Mondol by a three-point gap for the gold medal in the air pistol. With her historic victory, Gorrin grabbed one of the Olympic slots to ensure her place on the Venezuelan shooting team for the Games.

At the 2004 Summer Olympics in Athens, Gorrin qualified for the Venezuelan squad in pistol shooting, by having attained a mandatory Olympic standard of 379 and claiming the gold medal in air pistol from the Pan American Games. Gorrin started off her Olympic run poorly, as she rounded out the field of 41 shooters with a score of 358 points in the 10 m air pistol prelims. On her second event, 25 m pistol, Gorrin registered 271 points in three precision series and 263 in the rapid fire stage to accumulate an overall record of 534 points, but maintained her position from the previous event with the lowest score.

References

External links
ISSF Profile

1983 births
Living people
Venezuelan female sport shooters
Olympic shooters of Venezuela
Shooters at the 2004 Summer Olympics
Shooters at the 2003 Pan American Games
Pan American Games gold medalists for Venezuela
Sportspeople from Valencia, Venezuela
Pan American Games medalists in shooting
Medalists at the 2003 Pan American Games
20th-century Venezuelan women
21st-century Venezuelan women